Pakistani Punjabi Lollywood films were most popular in 1960s considered as their golden age. Lahore has 21 cinemas as of 2014. A list of Pakistani Punjabi films in year order:

1949

1950s

1960s
{| class="wikitable"
|-
! Title !! Director !! Cast !! Genre !! Notes
|-
|  | 1960
|-
|Behrupia ||Aslam Irani ||Meena Shorey, Akmal Khan, Zarif, Mazhar Shah, Ajmal ||Comedy ||Music by Tufail Farooqi.
|-
|Mitti Dian Murtaan ||Riaz Ahmad Raju||Bahar Begum, Aslam Pervaiz, Zarif, Nazar ||Drama ||The film was released on October 21, 1960. Music by Ghulam Ahmed Chishti with one super-hit film song related to the film's title.
|-
|Rani Khan ||M. J. Rana ||Husna, Akmal Khan, Nazar, Zarif ||Drama ||Noor Jehan started her solo career as a Punjabi playback singer in this film. The film was released on November 4, 1960.
|-
|Sohni Kumharan ||Wali Sahib ||Bahar, Aslam Pervaiz, Zarif, Ajmal ||Romance film based on Punjabi epic love story Sohni Mahiwal ||Music by Hassan Latif Lilak and film song lyrics by Hazin Qadri.
|-
|  | 1961
|-
|Aabroo ||Sheikh Abdul Rehman ||Bahar, Akmal Khan, Rekha, Ghulam Mohammed, Sikkedar, Ilyas Kashmiri ||RomanceDrama ||First Pakistani film in Saraiki language. Music by Ghulam Ahmed Chishti, film song lyrics by Sikkedar and Tufail Hoshiarpuri. One super-hit film song sung by Nahid Niazi.
|-
|Dandian || ||Yasmin, Aslam Pervaiz, Munawar Zarif ||Comedy ||Debut film for Munawar Zarif.
|-
|Mangti || ||Bahar, Aslam Pervaiz ||Drama ||
|-
|Muftbar ||Aslam Irani ||Musarrat Nazir, Akmal Khan, Zarif, A. Shah Shikarpuri ||RomanceComedy ||Music by Tufail Farooqi.
|-
|  | 1962
|-
|Billo Jee ||M. Ejaz ||Sawarn Lata, Habib, Nazir ||Romance||
|-
|Chouhdry ||Muzaffar Tahir ||Naghma, Akmal Khan, Asif Jah||Drama ||
|-
|Jamalo ||M. J. Rana ||Meena Shorey, Asad Bokhari, Naghma ||Romance ||
|-
|Paharan ||Farrukh Bokhari ||Yasmin, Yousuf Khan, Talish ||Romance ||
|-
|  | 1963
|-
|Chacha Khamkha || ||Laila, Sudhir, Mazhar Shah ||Comedy film ||
|-
|Choorian (1963 film) ||Amin Malik ||Laila, Akmal Khan, Mazhar Shah, Rangeela ||Drama ||This super-hit film was released on May 17, 1963. Music by Tufail Farooqi and film song lyrics by Baba Alam Siaposh. It was a Golden Jubilee film of 1963.
|-
|Mehndi Wale Hath ||S. Suleman ||Zeba, Sultan Rahi, Nazar, Talish ||Drama ||
|-
|Mouj Mela ||Aslam Irani ||Neelo, Habib, Rani  ||Romance ||The film was released on February 26, 1963. It was a Golden Jubilee film of 1963.
|-
|Rishta  ||N. E. Akhtar ||Sabiha, Santosh, Rangeela ||Drama ||Music by Ghulam Ahmed Chishti. This was the debut film of playback singer Masood Rana.
|-
|Tees Mar Khan ||Haidar Choudhary ||Shirin, Allauddin, Zeenat Begum, Asif Jah||Drama ||The film was released on August 30, 1963. It was the debut film for the music team of Manzoor Ashra'.
|-
|  | 1964
|-
|Bharjai  ||Haider Chaudhry ||Bahar, Akmal Khan, Zahoor Shah, Asif Jah, Ajmal, Sawan ||Drama ||This film did 'average' business at the box office. Music by Manzoor Ashraf.
|-
|Daachi  ||Aslam Irani ||Neelo, Sudhir, Naghma, A. Shah, Nazar, Munawar Zarif ||Musical, Drama ||This film is about a strange camel and a corrupt adviser, film was ad was released on February 15, 1964. It was a landmark movie for playback singer Masood Rana, who shot to fame after a mega-hit film song in this movie. Music by Ghulam Ahmed Chishti.
|-
|Ek Perdesi Ek Mutiyar ||Luqman ||Naghma, Asad Bokhari, Allauddin, Asif Jah||Romance ||Music by Salim Iqbal.
|-
|Hath Jori ||Aslam Irani ||Naghma, Akmal Khan, Razia, Munawar Zarif, Rangeela ||Drama ||The film was released on December 4, 1964. It was a Golden Jubilee film by Ghulam Ahmed Chishti. Film song lyrics by Hazeen Qadri.
|-
|Jugni  ||Shafi Ejaz ||Neelo, Yousuf Khan, M. Ismael ||Romance ||
|-
|Laadli ||Haider Chaudhry ||Nasira, Akmal Khan, Zeenat Begum||Romance ||
|-
|Lai Lug ||Khawaja Mohiuddin ||Firdous, Ejaz Durrani, Allauddin ||ComedyDrama||Super-hit music by Master Inayat Hussain.
|-
|Malang ||A. Hameed ||Firdous, Allauddin, Sawan ||Drama ||
|-
|Mama Jee ||Amin Malik ||Laila, Sudhir, Habib, Talish || ||
|-
|Mera Mahi ||M. J. Rana ||Neelo, Akmal Khan, Nazar, Asad Bokhari, Zeenat Begum ||Romance|| A musical hit by music director Ghulam Ahmed Chishti.
|-
|Sher Di Bachi ||Jafar Bokhari ||Neelo, Mohammad Ali, M. Ismael ||Drama ||
|-
|Pani (1964 film)|Pani ||Jafar Bokhari ||Shirin, Akmal Khan, Mazhar Shah ||Drama ||
|-
|Walait Pass ||Muzaffar Tahir ||Shirin, Akmal Khan, Asif Jah, Zeenat Begum ||Comedy, Romance ||Music by Ashiq Hussain.
|-
|Waris Shah ||Saeed Ashrafi ||Bahar, Akmal Khan, Meena Shorey, Nasira, Asif Jah||Drama, Romance ||This film was based on the love story of Waris Shah and Bhag Bhari. It was released on March 14, 1964. This movie was a biography of the traditional Punjabi epic love story author and 18th century poet Waris Shah.
|-
|  | 1965
|-
|Chokidar || ||Naghma, Asad Bokhari, Zahoor Shah ||Drama ||
|-
|Doli ||Haider Chaudhry ||Naghma, Akmal Khan, Mazhar Shah ||RomanceDrama ||This was a musical super-hit movie of 1965 with music by Manzoor Ashraf and film song lyrics by Tanvir Naqvi.
|-
|Had Haram ||Anwar Kamal Pasha ||Shirin, Allauddin, Asif Jah ||Comedy Romance ||Music by Master Abdullah.
|-
|Heer Sial ||Jafar Bokhari ||Firdous, Akmal Khan, M. Ismael ||Musical story based on a Punjabi epic love story ||The film was released on September 3, 1965. It was a musical hit with music by 'Bakhshi Wazir and film song lyrics by Tanvir Naqvi.
|-
|Ik Si Chor ||Amin Malik ||Shirin, Allauddin, Yousuf Khan ||Drama ||Music by Master Abdullah.
|-
|Jeedaar ||M. J. Rana ||Neelo, Sudhir, Habib, Shirin, Rangeela, Munawar Zarif ||MusicalDrama ||The film was released on November 19, 1965. Music by Rasheed Attre and film song lyrics by Hazeen Qadri. This was a Platinum Jubilee film.
|-
|Jhanjhar || ||Firdous, Habib, Adeeb ||Romance ||
|-
|Malangi ||Rasheed Akhtar ||Shirin, Akmal Khan, Firdous, Yousuf Khan, Zumurrud, Munawar Zarif ||MusicalDrama ||The film was released on December 14, 1965. Super-hit music by Master Abdullah and lyrics by Hazin Qadri. It was a Golden Jubilee film of 1965.
|-
|Mann Mouji || ||Shirin, Sudhir, Akmal || Drama ||Music by Tufail Farooqi and film song lyrics by Hazeen Qadri.
|-
|Phanney Khan || ||Shirin, Sudhir, Allauddin ||Romance, Drama ||Super-hit music by Salim Iqbal and film song lyrics by Hazin Qadri.
|-
|Pilpili Sahib  || ||Naghma, Akmal Khan, Noor Mohammed Charlie || ||
|-
|Punjab Da Sher || ||Naghma, Akmal Khan, Mazhar Shah ||Drama ||
|-
|Soukan || ||Yasmin, Akmal Khan, Mazhar Shah ||Drama, Romance ||
|-
|  | 1966
|-
|Bharia Mela ||Aslam Irani ||Naghma, Akmal Khan, Sawan, Talish, Rangeela, Munawar Zarif ||Romance, Drama ||A super-hit musical film of 1966 with music by Ghulam Ahmed Chishti.
|-
|  | 1967
|-
|Mirza Jat ||Masood Pervaiz ||Firdous, Ejaz Durrani, Aalia, Munawar Zarif, Meena Shorey, Ilyas Kashmiri ||Romance, Drama ||A Golden Jubilee film of 1967 that was also based on an epic love story of Punjab - Mirza Sahiban. Superb music of Rasheed Attre before he died in 1967. Excellent and super-sentimental film songs by the eminent lyricist Ahmad Rahi.
|-
|Imam Din Gohavia||M Saleem and Mohsin Jamali||Firdous, Akmal Khan, Yousuf Khan, Talish, Munawar Zarif||Historical Drama||Music by Ghulam Ahmed Chishti, film song lyrics by Khawaja Pervez
|-
|  | 1968
|-
| || || || ||
|-
|  | 1969
|-
|Mukhra Chann Warga||Waheed Dar||Naghma, Habib, Rani, Yousuf Khan||Romance film|| This was a super-hit Punjabi film of 1969 with music by Ghulam Ahmed Chishti.<ref>, Film Mukhra Chann Warga (1969) on cineplot.com website, Retrieved 25 June 2016</ref>
|-
|}

1970s

1980s

1990s

2000s

2010s

In 2015, only five Punjabi films were made in Lollywood. Punjabi films continued to languish in this year also. Punjabi releases such as Razia Phas Gayi Gundon Main, Shaan's Lahoria tay Pishoria, Gujjar Pooray Dinna Da, Sohna Gujjar and Sami Rawal'' all failed to make a mark on the box office in Pakistan.

2022

2023

See also
 List of Pakistani films
 List of Indian Punjabi films
 List of Urdu-language films

References

External links
 Search Punjabi films @ IMDB.com

Lists of Pakistani films